Sergeant Major of the Marine Corps (officially abbreviated to SMMC) is a billet, as well as a unique enlisted grade of rank, and is designated a special paygrade above E-9. The position also has a unique non-commissioned grade of rank insignia, in the United States Marine Corps. The holder of this rank and position is the most senior enlisted marine in the Marine Corps, unless an enlisted marine is serving as the Senior Enlisted Advisor to the Chairman.

History

In the U.S. Marine Corps, sergeant major is the ninth and highest enlisted rank, just above first sergeant, and equal in grade to master gunnery sergeant, although the two have different responsibilities. A sergeant major typically serves as the unit commander's senior enlisted adviser and to handle matters of discipline and morale among the enlisted Marines. The Sergeant Major of the Marine Corps is chosen by the Commandant of the Marine Corps to serve as his adviser and is the preeminent and highest ranking enlisted Marine, unless an enlisted marine is serving as the Senior Enlisted Advisor to the Chairman. The SMMC holds an order of precedence of a lieutenant general.

Although not officially considered a Sergeant Major of the Marine Corps, when Archibald Sommers was appointed to the grade of Sergeant Major January 1, 1801, it was a solitary post, similar to the modern billet of Sergeant Major of the Marine Corps. In 1833, an act of legislation made the rank of sergeant major permanent for the Marine Corps and by 1899 five Marines held the rank of sergeant major. This continued until 1946, when the rank was abolished, only to be re-introduced in 1954 as part of the Marine Corps rank structure.

The post of Sergeant Major of the Marine Corps was established in 1957 from the order of Assistant Chief of Staff for Personnel at Headquarters Marine Corps, Brigadier General James P. Berkeley, as the Senior Enlisted Advisor to the Commandant of the Marine Corps, the first such post in any of the five branches of the United States Armed Forces. In 1970, the rank insignia of the Sergeant Major of the Marine Corps was authorized (which features three stripes, the Eagle, Globe, and Anchor flanked by two five-point stars in the center, and four rockers) as opposed to the standard Sergeant Major rank insignia (which features three stripes, one five-point star in the center, and four rockers), which was used for the rank from the post's creation in 1957 to 1970. While "Sergeant Major of the Marine Corps" is the full wording of the rank, the verbal address for this is commonly Sergeant Major.

The Sergeant Major of the Marine Corps is selected by the Commandant of the Marine Corps and typically serves a four-year term, though his service is at the discretion of the Commandant. Since Sergeant Major Wilbur Bestwick was appointed the first Sergeant Major of the Marine Corps in 1957, 19 different Marines have filled this post.

In April, 2019, Sergeant Major Troy E. Black was announced to be the next Sergeant Major of the Marine Corps. Black succeeded Sergeant Major Green at a ceremony on July 26, 2019.

Sergeants Major of the Marine Corps

Timeline

See also
 Sergeant Major of the Army
 Master Chief Petty Officer of the Navy
 Chief Master Sergeant of the Air Force
 Chief Master Sergeant of the Space Force
 Master Chief Petty Officer of the Coast Guard
 Senior Enlisted Advisor for the National Guard Bureau
 Senior Enlisted Advisor to the Chairman of the Joint Chiefs of Staff

References
General
 

Specific

External links 
 

Senior Enlisted Advisor
United States Marine Corps leadership
United States Marine Corps lists
Military ranks of the United States Marine Corps
1957 establishments in the United States